Cheirodon kiliani is a species of fish in the family Characidae endemic to Chile.

Named in honor of Campos' teacher, Ernst Kilian, founding director of Instituto de Zoología, Austral_University_of_Chile, Chile.

References

kiliani
Freshwater fish of Chile
Fish described in 1982
Taxonomy articles created by Polbot
Endemic fauna of Chile